Zuck may refer to:

People
Hendrick Zuck, German footballer
Mark Zuckerberg, Facebook founder and CEO
Roy B. Zuck, American author
Tim Zuck, Canadian artist
Zuck Carlson, American football player

Places
 Zuck, Ohio
 Chongqing Jiangbei International Airport (ICAO code: ZUCK)

See also
Bertha Zück
Zucc (disambiguation)